Chapman Intermediate School was formerly the only intermediate school in the Cherokee County School District in Woodstock, Georgia, United States. The school served fifth and sixth graders. In the spring of 2013, Chapman Intermediate School was closed, as it was no longer needed.  Students who would have attended it now attend one of the four feeder elementary schools until fifth grade, and then attend E.T. Booth Middle School in sixth grade. Chapman opened in 2000 with approximately 1150 fifth and sixth grade students and a staff of almost 100.

History
Until 1935, there was a small school located across from Bascomb Church on what is now Bascomb-Carmel Road. It consisted of grades one through seven. For the first few years of his teaching career, Clarence Chapman was the principal as well as one of the teachers. In 1935, Bascomb School was consolidated with another elementary school and was later torn down.

South Cherokee County remained a rural area into the mid-1960s. Highway 92 was paved in 1962. Until that time it had been an all-weather graveled road and was known as the Old Alabama Road.

By 1966, Oak Grove School still had only one teacher per grade, from fourth through eighth grade. The total enrollment was 350 students. Woodstock School had an enrollment of around 600 students.

Around this time, south Cherokee County began growing by leaps and bounds. People began moving to the area and driving to work in Atlanta. Woodstock Elementary and Oak Grove Elementary were both too small for the incoming students. Rooms and buildings were added, only to be outgrown before they were completed. A new school was the only answer. The property of the Chapman family was purchased for the new school. Construction was begun in 1971 and completed in February 1974. From August 1973 until February 1974, the Chapman faculty and students were split and located at Woodstock and Oak Grove.

The school opened with grades one through eight. The first principal was Young Smith. During the 1970s and 1980s, the area continued to grow and E.T. Booth Middle School was built and opened nearby. The seventh and eighth grade students from Chapman and other south Cherokee elementary schools were transferred to the new middle school.

A large two-story classroom building was added to the Chapman campus in 1990 to accommodate its ever-increasing enrollment.

During the 1998–1999 school year, once again some decisions were needed to make arrangements for the growing schools in the area. With parent and faculty input, the decision was made to create a school for fifth- and sixth-grade students and to house this new school at the Chapman campus. Preparations were made to transition these students from Bascomb, Boston, and Oak Grove Elementaries.

In August 2000, Chapman Intermediate School opened with approximately 1150 fifth- and sixth-grade students and a staff of almost 100.

In 2011, the building of the new E.T. Booth Middle School began. This took sixth grade, and the elementary schools took fifth grade. It is speculated that Chapman will become a ninth grade academy for Etowah High School.

In January 2014, Chapman became Etowah East High School and featured some technology-based classes, such as AP Computer Science. In the 2014–2015 school year, Chapman's cafeteria opened to students traveling between Etowah High School and Etowah East. The other building at Etowah East became home to the world language department in August 2014. As a result, all trailers at Etowah High were scheduled to be removed from campus at the end of the 2013–2014 school year.

External links
 Official school website
 Cherokee County School District website

Schools in Cherokee County, Georgia
Educational institutions established in 2000
Public middle schools in Georgia (U.S. state)
2000 establishments in Georgia (U.S. state)